In embryogenesis, the sex cords (primitive sex cords, primitive seminiferous cords, or gonadal cords) are structures that develop from the genital ridges that further differentiate based on an embryo's sex. After sexual differentiation, at day 49, the sex cords in females become the cortical cords, also called secondary cords. After further development, they become the ovarian follicles. The sex cords in males become the testis cords by the action of the testis-determining factor protein, which helps to develop and nourish the Sertoli cells. 

The testis cords are precursors to the rete testis. They play several different roles in the development of the male genitals. The primitive sex cords originate from the proliferation of the epithelium of the two genital ridges. These epithelial cells (from the genital ridges) penetrate and invade the underlying mesenchyme to form the primitive sex cords. This occurs shortly before and during the arrival of the primordial germ cells (PGCs) to the paired genital ridges.

See also
 Development of the gonads
 Sex cord-stromal tumour

References

External links
 

Embryology of urogenital system